Monochamus mexicanus is a species of beetle in the family Cerambycidae. It was described by Stephan von Breuning in 1950. It is known from Mexico.

References

mexicanus
Beetles described in 1950